The following is a list of awards and nominations received by English actress Florence Pugh. She gained recognition for her portrayal of an unhappily married woman in the independent drama film Lady Macbeth (2016). Her performance won her the British Independent Film Award for Best Actress. In 2019, she received further critical acclaim – for her performances as Dani Ardor in the horror film Midsommar and as Amy March in the period film Little Women. The latter earned her nominations for the BAFTA Award and Academy Award for Best Supporting Actress.

Major associations

Academy Awards

British Academy Film Awards

Other awards and nominations

AACTA Awards

Alliance of Women Film Journalists

Austin Film Critics Association

BAFTA Scotland Awards

BFI London Film Festival

Boston Society of Film Critics

British Independent Film Awards

Cannes Film Festival

Chicago Film Critics Association

Critics' Choice Movie Awards

Critics' Choice Super Awards

Dallas–Fort Worth Film Critics Association

Detroit Film Critics Society

Dorian Awards

Dublin Film Critics' Circle

Dublin International Film Festival

Empire Awards

European Film Awards

Evening Standard British Film Awards

Fangoria Chainsaw Awards

Festival 2 Cinéma 2 Valenciennes

Florida Film Critics Circle

Georgia Film Critics Association

Gotham Awards

Hollywood Critics Association TV Awards

Houston Film Critics Society

IndieWire Critics Poll

London Film Critics' Circle

Montclair Film Festival

National Film Awards

National Society of Film Critics

NME Awards

Online Film Critics Society

People's Choice Awards

San Diego Film Critics Society

Santa Barbara International Film Festival

Seattle Film Critics Society

St. Louis Film Critics Association

Toronto Film Critics Association

Vancouver Film Critics Circle

Washington D.C. Area Film Critics Association

Women Film Critics Circle

Critics associations

Notes

References

External links
 Florence Pugh — Awards at the Internet Movie Database

Pugh, Florence